Kettunen is a Finnish surname, most prevalent in North Karelia. Notable people with the surname include:

 Kettunen, a finnicized name of the family Alopaeus
 Lauri Kettunen (1885–1963), Finnish linguist
 Eino Kettunen (1894–1964), Finnish composer
 Lauri Kettunen (1905–1941), Finnish fencer and modern pentathlete
 Pauli Kettunen (born 1953), Finnish historian
 Outi Kettunen (born 1978), Finnish biathlete
 Elina Kettunen (born 1981), Finnish figure skater
 Tuomas Kettunen (born 1988), Finnish politician

Finnish-language surnames
Surnames of Finnish origin